The DGC Award for Outstanding Directorial Achievement in Feature Film is an annual Canadian award, presented by the Directors Guild of Canada to honour the year's best direction in feature films in Canada.

Winners and nominees

2000s

2010s

2020s

References

Feature film
Awards for best director